Joachim Müller may refer to:

Joachim Daniel Andreas Müller (1812–1857), a Swedish gardener and writer
Joachim Müller (politician), member of the 10th Bundestag
Joachim Müller (footballer, born 1952)
Joachim Müller (footballer, born 1961)